Burlington Canal Lift Bridge is a vertical lift bridge located to the north side of the Burlington Bay James N. Allan Skyway in Burlington, Ontario.

Built in 1962, the  bridge is the sixth bridge to span the Burlington Canal since 1830.  The bridge allows vessels to enter and exit from Hamilton Harbour into Lake Ontario. The bridge does not lift during the winter months (January to late March).

The bridge carries Eastport Drive across the canal with two lanes for traffic in each direction, as well as a single pedestrian walkway on the west side. Traffic light and signalized gates are found on both ends of the bridge. The road surface on the bridge is not paved, but rather metal grating.

In 1896 Hamilton Radial Electric Railway cars crossed the 1877 bridge. Before 1982 it also carried rail traffic along a CN Rail (Hamilton and North-Western Railway) route but the section of the line was removed and the bridge converted to a vehicular bridge.

The bridge is maintained and owned by Public Works Canada.

Earlier Bridges

Several bridges were built from 1826 to 1952 to accommodate railway, radial and vehicular traffic:

 1826: wooden bridge built; damaged in storm
 1830: swing bridge built; damaged by schooner Elsie Hope 
 1877: 375 foot through-truss manual swing bridge built by Hamilton and North-Western Railway replaces scow service
 1901: steel truss electric swing bridge 
 1921-1922: single leaf bascule bridge
 1952: temporary bridge built to replace the north leaf bascule bridge

The last three bridges were demolished following the completion of the current bridge in 1962.

References

External links

Bridges completed in 1962
Buildings and structures in Burlington, Ontario
Transport buildings and structures in Hamilton, Ontario
Transport in Burlington, Ontario
Rail infrastructure in Hamilton, Ontario
Road bridges in Ontario
Lake Ontario
Transport in the Greater Toronto Area
Vertical lift bridges in Canada